George Henry Clinton was a chemist, lawyer, and Democratic politician from St. Joseph in Tensas Parish in the northeastern Mississippi River delta of the U.S. state of Louisiana.

Clinton was born in the late 1860s in Natchez in western Mississippi. His father was a native of East Feliciana Parish, one of the Florida Parishes of southeastern Louisiana. The senior Clinton served in the Confederate Army and became the district attorney for the Louisiana 6th Judicial District, based about St. Joseph, Tallulah in Madison Parish, and Lake Providence in East Carroll Parish. Clinton's mother was part of the Briscoe family of Claiborne County, Mississippi.

Clinton attended school in New Orleans and at the Chamberlain-Hunt Academy in Port Gibson, Mississippi, before he graduated in 1889 from Louisiana State University in Baton Rouge. Clinton worked as a sugar chemist in Louisiana, Cuba, and Mexico. In 1898, he began his legal practice in St. Joseph. Clinton served on the LSU Board of Supervisors.

He was a state representative from 1908 to 1912, having served alongside the cotton planter Samuel W. Martien of Waterproof in southern Tensas Parish. He was twice a state senator, from 1912 to 1916 and again from 1920 to 1924. Clinton also served on the Louisiana Board of Appraisers and was a director of the East Louisiana State Hospital. He was a member and president of the Tensas Parish School Board, based in St. Joseph, and a delegate to the 1913 and 1921 state constitutional conventions.

Nothing is known of Clinton after he left the state Senate in 1924. He is not buried in Legion Memorial Cemetery in Newellton nor is he listed at Natchez City Cemetery, the resting place of most whites in St. Joseph until the middle to late 1940s.

References

 

Year of birth missing
Year of death missing
Democratic Party members of the Louisiana House of Representatives
Democratic Party Louisiana state senators
School board members in Louisiana
Politicians from Natchez, Mississippi
People from St. Joseph, Louisiana
Louisiana lawyers
American chemists